Zachotín is a municipality and village in Pelhřimov District in the Vysočina Region of the Czech Republic. It has about 200 inhabitants.

Administrative parts
Villages of Častonín and Petrkov are administrative parts of Zachotín.

Notable people
Joseph Pipal (1874–1955), American football, basketball, and track and field coach

References

Villages in Pelhřimov District